Ernest Ewart Gladstone Alderwick (4 April 1886 – 26 August 1917) was an English cricketer who played as a right-handed batsman for Gloucestershire in 1908. He was born in Bristol and died in the First World War at Peronne on the Somme.

Alderwick made his debut as a lower-order batsman against Worcestershire, against whom he scored just seven runs in two innings, while his team went down to a 225-run defeat. He played in the next game, three days after his first and against Northamptonshire, but he scored a duck in his only innings before the match was abandoned for a draw. In 1914, he played a couple of Minor Counties games as an opening batsman for Suffolk.

References

1886 births
1917 deaths
English cricketers
Gloucestershire cricketers
Cricketers from Bristol
Suffolk cricketers
British military personnel killed in World War I
Suffolk Regiment officers
British Army personnel of World War I